Garifa railway station is a railway station on Naihati – Bandel Branch line of Howrah railway division of Eastern Railway zone. It is situated at Hazi Nagar, Ramghat, Garifa in North 24 Parganas district in the Indian state of West Bengal. Garifa is a connecting station of Sealdah main line and Howrah–Bardhaman main line through Sampreeti Bridge and Jubilee Bridge. Number of Passenger and Naihati Bandel EMU locals stop at Garifa railway station.

References

Railway stations in North 24 Parganas district
Howrah railway division
Kolkata Suburban Railway stations